The Journal of Applied Econometrics is a peer-reviewed academic journal covering econometrics, published by John Wiley & Sons. It focuses on applications rather than theoretical issues. It was established in 1986 and is published seven times per year. Its editor-in-chief is Barbara Rossi. Since 1994 it has required its authors to deposit a complete set of data (provided they are non-confidential) into the journal's Data Archive, in order to enable the replication of empirical results published in the journal.

References

External links
 

Econometrics journals
Publications established in 1986
Wiley (publisher) academic journals
English-language journals
7 times per year journals